Gary W. Flakne (March 12, 1934 – January 3, 2016) was an American politician in the state of Minnesota. He was born in Minneapolis, Minnesota of Norwegian descent and was a lawyer. He was an alumnus of the University of Minnesota and William Mitchell College of Law (L.L.B. 1960). He served in the House of Representatives for District 35 from 1963 to 1973, and for District 61A in 1973. Flakne served in the Minnesota National Guard and was judge advocate general; he later served in the Minnesota Reserves. He also served as Hennepin County attorney. Flakne died on January 3, 2016, from multiple organ failure. He was married with four children.

References

1934 births
2016 deaths
Republican Party members of the Minnesota House of Representatives
Politicians from Minneapolis
American people of Norwegian descent
Military personnel from Minnesota
Minnesota lawyers
University of Minnesota alumni
William Mitchell College of Law alumni
Lawyers from Minneapolis
20th-century American lawyers